The giant haplochromis (Hemitilapia oxyrhyncha) is a species of cichlid endemic to Lake Malawi and Lake Malombe, preferring areas with sandy substrates and Vallisneria patches.  It is an algae eater, obtaining its food by scraping it from the leaves of aquatic plants.  This species grows to a length of  TL.  This fish can also be found in the aquarium trade.  This species is the only known member of its genus.

References

Haplochromini
Monotypic fish genera
 
Taxonomy articles created by Polbot
Fish described in 1902
Taxa named by George Albert Boulenger
Taxobox binomials not recognized by IUCN